Asigliano may refer to:

 Asigliano Veneto, town and comune in the province of Vicenza, Veneto, Italy
 Asigliano Vercellese, municipality in the Province of Vercelli in the Italian region Piedmont

See also 

 Arigliano
 Avigliano